A series of major bushfires occurred between 26 January and 10 March 1926 in the state of Victoria in  Australia. A total of 60 people were killed with 700 injured, and 1000 buildings and 390,000 ha were destroyed across the south-east of the state.

On 14 February, later referred to as Black Sunday, bushfires swept across Gippsland, the Yarra Valley, the Dandenong Ranges and the Kinglake area. The fires had originated in forest areas on 26 January, but wind gusts of up to 97 km per hour led to the joining of the fire fronts on 14 February. In the Warburton area, 31 deaths were recorded including 14 at Wooley's Mill in Gilderoy, 6 at Big Pats Creek and 2 at Powelltown. Other affected settlements included  Noojee, Erica and  Kinglake,
where St Mary's Church and Thompson's Hotel were amongst the buildings destroyed.

References

1925
1925 fires in Oceania
1925 in the environment 
1926 fires in Oceania
1926 in the environment 
1920s in Victoria (Australia)
1920s wildfires
1925 in Australia
1926 in Australia
1926 disasters in Australia
1925 disasters in Australia